Duke Theodore Rostislavich nicknamed Theodore the Black (c. 1230s –  1298), Феодор Ростиславич Чёрный (Чёрмный) or  Fyodor the Black in Russian (Fyodor or Fedor being the Russian version of Theodore), is a saint of the Russian Orthodox Church and was a ruler of Smolensk and Yaroslavl. The alternative interpretation of his nickname is Theodore the Beautiful.

Biography

Early Years 
His father, Prince Rostislav Mstislavovich of Smolensk, died in 1240. Since his birth, Theodore was a Duke of Mozhaysk. In 1260 Theodore married Maria Vasilievna (born between 1243 and 1249), the daughter of Prince Basil of Yaroslavl. Contemporary research indicates, that her actual name was Anastasia, and only after the 16–17th centuries changed in fasti by mistake. Through marriage Theodore became prince of Yaroslavl, however, the actual power was concentrated in hands of Princess Xenia of Yaroslavl, Maria's mother. With this wife Theodore had two daughters and a son, Michael.

The Golden Horde 
Bored with his status, around 1266 Theodore left his family and on his own initiative went to Sarai, the capital of the Golden Horde. He became a loyal servant and military commander of Khan Mengu-Timur. Theodore the Black took part in Mungu-Timur invasion in Ossetia, in 1277–1278 he headed the punitive campaign in the Volga Bulgaria. According to the historical documents, his troops sacked 40 cities and 600 villages with the peculiar ferocity.

Upon the successful campaign Mengu-Timur promoted Theodore to his butler and offered to marry one of his daughters. The fasti state, that Theodore rejected this offer, because he still had a wife in Yaroslavl. Three years later he received a message about Maria's death and came back to  Yaroslavl, trying to regain the power. However, Xenia and the boyars refused to let enter the city, so he came back to the Horde.

Later Theodore married the daughter of the Nogai Khan, who was baptized and received the Christian name Anna. With the marriage Theodore received a huge dowry (according to the fasti, 36 towns) and rose to prominence in the Horde. He and Anna had two sons, David and Constantine. In 1290 Michael Theodorovich died in Yaroslavl, so Theodore the Black with his Jarlig from the Mongols returned in the city to rule.

The Prince of Yaroslavl 
Upon death of his brothers in 1278–1279, Theodore inherited the Principality of Smolensk. Presumably, in 1279–1281 he resided in Smolensk, then again moved to the Horde. Later he took part in the war between the sons of Alexander Nevsky, that ended with the destruction of many Russian towns by both the Mongols and the Russians.

In 1293 Theodore took part in Khan Dyuden war against the North-East Rus', in which 14 important towns were sacked by the Mongols.

Last Years 
In his last years Theodore the Black became a monk and died in Yaroslavl in 1299. He was canonized due to the depth of deathbed repentance.

References

Sources 

Russian saints of the Eastern Orthodox Church
Princes of Smolensk
People from Yaroslavl
1230s births
1299 deaths
Eastern Orthodox royal saints
Rostislavichi family (Smolensk)